Shutter Release is the second studio album by the electronic band Lymbyc Systym. It was released in 2009 on Mush Records.

Track listing

References

2009 albums
Lymbyc Systym albums
Mush Records albums